William John Aitken (2 February 1894 – 9 August 1973) was a Scottish football player and manager.

A forward, he was known for his trait of bouncing the ball on his head whilst running along the touchline, and was normally known as Willie or Billy. He began his career at Kirkintilloch, before joining Rangers via Queen's Park in 1918. He signed with Port Vale in 1919, before he was sold on to Newcastle United for £2,500 in May 1920. He spent four seasons at Tyneside, before joining Preston North End in 1924. He spent two years with the "Lambs", and after spells at Chorley, Norwich City, and Bideford Town, he was appointed as head coach at Italian club Juventus in 1928. He moved on to France the following year to play for AS Cannes. He played in the 1932 Coupe de France final victory, and was later appointed as club manager. He then spent 1934 to 1936 as player-manager at Stade de Reims, and then took charge at FC Antibes between 1936 and 1938. During World War II he worked as a defence contractor at Vickers-Armstrongs, and he coached across Europe and also worked for a wine and spirits distributor.

Career
Aitken played for amateur sides Kirkintilloch and Queen's Park, before joining Rangers for the 1918–19 season. He scored two goals in 21 league games as they finished second to Old Firm rivals Celtic in the Scottish League Division One. Aitken then left Ibrox Park for England to play for Port Vale in the summer of 1919. He scored on his debut at inside-right in a 2–0 win at Aston Villa Reserves in a Central League match on 20 August 1919. After Vale were elected to the Football League Second Division in October 1919, the Vale were forced to pay £500 to Rangers for his and Peter Pursell services. He scored nine goals in 44 games in 1919–20, and was in the cup winning sides of 1920. He was sold on to Newcastle United for £2,500 in May 1920, which was considered a bargain at the time.

He began playing as an inside-forward at St James' Park, and although he only scored ten goals in 110 league games in four seasons at the club, his unselfishness in attack and overall contribution to the team was greatly appreciated. Newcastle finished fifth in the First Division in 1920–21, with Aitken claiming three goals in 38 appearances. He was limited to 16 games as United finished seventh in 1921–22. They then finished fourth in 1922–23, with Aitken scoring four goals in 26 matches. He scored three goals in 30 appearances as Newcastle posted a ninth-place finish in 1923–24. He played alongside Stan Seymour and Tommy McDonald. In 1924 Aitken signed for Preston North End for £1,000. He then joined Chorley, Norwich City, and Bideford Town.

He travelled to Italy, and impressed Juventus chairman Edoardo Agnelli with his idea of exporting the playing system pioneered by Arsenal manager Herbert Chapman. However, not everyone was convinced by his new methods, and some "Juve" players were unwilling to put in the extra work required to make the system work. He nevertheless led the "Old Lady" to a third-place finish in 1929–30. Though he found little success at Stadio di Corso Marsiglia, his methods were built upon by future coaches at the club. He was unable to take to the field as player, as foreigners were not permitted to play in the Italian leagues. He eventually ended up playing and coaching football in France for AS Cannes, Stade de Reims and FC Antibes. At Cannes he was part of the team that reached the Coupe de France final at the Stade Olympique Yves-du-Manoir on 24 April 1932, which they won 1–0 over RC Roubaix. They also finished as runners-up in the Ligue de Football Professionnel in 1932–33. With Stade Reims, he won the Championnat de France amateur league in 1935.

Later life
He returned to Britain during World War II, and worked as a defence contractor at Vickers-Armstrongs. He later coached in Belgium (Royale Union Saint-Gilloise) and Norway (SK Brann), and became a representative of a wine and spirits distributor in Tyne and Wear.

Career statistics

Honours
AS Cannes
Coupe de France: 1932

Stade Reims
Championnat de France amateur: 1935

References

1894 births
1973 deaths
People from Peterhead
Footballers from Aberdeenshire
Scottish footballers
Association football forwards
Kirkintilloch Rob Roy F.C. players
Queen's Park F.C. players
Rangers F.C. players
Port Vale F.C. players
Newcastle United F.C. players
Preston North End F.C. players
Chorley F.C. players
Norwich City F.C. players
Bideford A.F.C. players
Scottish expatriate footballers
Scottish expatriate sportspeople in Italy
Expatriate footballers in Italy
Juventus F.C. players
Scottish expatriate sportspeople in Belgium
Scottish expatriate sportspeople in France
Scottish expatriate sportspeople in Norway
Expatriate footballers in France
AS Cannes players
Stade de Reims players
FC Antibes players
Scottish Football League players
English Football League players
Serie A players
Ligue 1 players
Association football player-managers
Scottish football managers
Scottish expatriate football managers
Expatriate football managers in Italy
Juventus F.C. managers
Expatriate football managers in France
AS Cannes managers
Stade de Reims managers
Expatriate football managers in Belgium
Expatriate football managers in Norway
SK Brann managers
Serie A managers
Ligue 1 managers